Erik Lund (born 3 July 1979, Fredrikstad, Norway) is a former Norwegian rugby union footballer who played lock forward for Norway and since 2010 for the French team Biarritz, where he joined his younger brother Magnus. He formerly captained Leeds Carnegie.

The son of Norwegian basketball international Morten Lund, his family moved to England when he was 6 months old, where future England flanker Magnus was born.

Erik Lund played for the Jesmond Jaguars and a small number of games for Medicals RFC while he was at the University of Newcastle.

He became a computer programmer after graduating and started playing rugby socially with Winnington Park in Cheshire, but he started taking steps up the rugby ladder, moving on to Manchester Rugby Club, Fylde Rugby Club, Sedgley Park R.U.F.C. and Rotherham R.U.F.C. He also became an international rugby player, returning to play for Norway when his work commitments would allow.

Lund's breakthrough was made at Rotherham in National Division One, always seen as a player with physical potential he was able to refine his technique and became highly motivated under the training of head coach Andre Bester, following this form he was signed by Leeds ahead of their Premiership Campaign.

Nicknamed the Viking, which was his wrestling name – something he almost entered professionally.

He was picked for the Barbarians squad against Wales in June 2011.

Notes and references

External links

 Erik Lund at Leeds Carnegie (Wayback Machine) 

 

1979 births
Biarritz Olympique players
English rugby union players
Living people
Rotherham Titans players
Sedgley Park R.U.F.C. players
Norwegian emigrants to England
Norwegian expatriate rugby union players
Expatriate rugby union players in France
English expatriate rugby union players
Norwegian expatriate sportspeople in England
Norwegian expatriate sportspeople in France
Sportspeople from Fredrikstad
Rugby union locks